Hamlet is a town in Davis and Oregon Townships, Starke County, in the U.S. state of Indiana. The population was 800 as of the 2010 census.

History
Hamlet was named after John Hamlet, who established the town in 1863. 

Two railroad lines once existed in Hamlet, one being a division of the former mainline of the Pennsylvania Railroad (PRR), running from Chicago, Illinois to Fort Wayne, Indiana, with the other line being the New York Central's (NYC) Kankakee Belt, running from Elkhart, Indiana to Kankakee, Illinois. In 1968, these two railroads merged to become the Penn Central Railroad. In 1976, Penn Central, along with several other languishing eastern railroads, were in bankruptcy, and was part of the Federal Government's takeover, creating Conrail.  Both rail lines continued to see heavy use until the late 1970s under Conrail. By the early 1980s, the Kankakee Belt had been abandoned and removed, and the former PRR mainline's traffic had dropped dramatically, due to redundant east/west Conrail lines.  Today, what remains of the former PRR mainline is operated by the Chicago, Fort Wayne & Eastern Railroad (CF&E), which services Hamlet's large CO-OP grain elevator during the fall harvest rush.

Hamlet was requested a Dollar General in 2020 and construction was completed in 2021. The Hamlet post office is in operation since 1864.

Geography

The Town of Hamlet was originally on both sides of US 30. In 1926 US 30 was realigned with the Indiana Realignment. U.S. Route 30 bypasses Hamlet, about a half mile to the north.

Demographics

2010 census
As of the census of 2010, there were 800 people, 299 households, and 225 families living in the town. The racial makeup of the town was 96.6% White, 1.0% Native American, 0.1% Asian, 0.6% from other races, and 1.6% from two or more races. Hispanic or Latino of any race were 2.6% of the population.

There were 299 households, of which 37.1% had children under the age of 18 living with them, 48.8% were married couples living together, 18.7% had a female householder with no husband present, 7.7% had a male householder with no wife present, and 24.7% were non-families. 19.7% of all households were made up of individuals, and 7.3% had someone living alone who was 65 years of age or older. The average household size was 2.68 and the average family size was 3.01.

The median age in the town was 35 years. 27.6% of residents were under the age of 18; 11.4% were between the ages of 18 and 24; 25.1% were from 25 to 44; 23.6% were from 45 to 64; and 12.6% were 65 years of age or older. The gender makeup of the town was 49.5% male and 50.5% female.

2000 census
As of the census of 2000, there were 820 people, 307 households, and 225 families living in the town. The racial makeup of the town was 98.05% White, 0.12% African American, 0.37% Native American, 0.49% Pacific Islander, 0.24% from other races, and 0.73% from two or more races. Hispanic or Latino of any race were 1.34% of the population.

There were 307 households, out of which 40.4% had children under the age of 18 living with them, 54.7% were married couples living together, 12.7% had a female householder with no husband present, and 26.4% were non-families. 21.2% of all households were made up of individuals, and 6.2% had someone living alone who was 65 years of age or older. The average household size was 2.67 and the average family size was 3.08.

In the town, the population was spread out, with 30.9% under the age of 18, 7.9% from 18 to 24, 31.8% from 25 to 44, 21.3% from 45 to 64, and 8.0% who were 65 years of age or older. The median age was 32 years. For every 100 females, there were 103.5 males. For every 100 females age 18 and over, there were 96.2 males.

The median income for a household in the town was $30,750, and the median income for a family was $36,389. Males had a median income of $28,036 versus $20,921 for females. The per capita income for the town was $12,811. About 15.4% of families and 17.3% of the population were below the poverty line, including 23.1% of those under age 18 and 15.0% of those age 65 or over.

Education
Hamlet has a public library, a branch of the Starke County Public Library System.

Notes

Towns in Starke County, Indiana
Towns in Indiana
Northwest Indiana